Ariadna María Gutiérrez Arévalo (born 25 December 1993) is a Colombian model, actress, and beauty pageant titleholder who was crowned Miss Colombia 2014. She represented Colombia in the Miss Universe 2015 competition on December 20, 2015, and placed first runner-up after host Steve Harvey mistakenly announced her as the winner. After pageantry, she appeared in the film XXX: Return of Xander Cage and tied for third place on Celebrity Big Brother 1.

Early life
Ariadna María Gutiérrez Arévalo was born in Sincelejo, Colombia. When she was seven months old, her parents moved to Barranquilla, where she was raised. She studied at the German School of Barranquilla. She is a cousin of Miss Universe 2014 and Miss Colombia 2013 winner Paulina Vega.

Career
Gutiérrez was awarded as Señorita Sucre (Miss Sucre Colombia 2014). She was subsequently crowned as Miss Colombia 2014. Currently, she is working as a professional model.

Gutiérrez competed at the Miss Colombia 2014, representing the Sucre Department, where she won the title of Miss Colombia, gaining the department's very first win at the Miss Colombia pageant. The version of the pageant she won was its 80th edition held on November 17, 2014, in Cartagena de Indias.

On November 16, 2015, Gutierrez crowned her successor, Andrea Tovar, as Miss Colombia 2015.

Gutiérrez represented Colombia at the 64th Miss Universe pageant and she was mistakenly crowned the winner from her country by host Steve Harvey. However, after Gutiérrez's crowning, Harvey realized that he had misread the result and should have announced her as the 1st runner-up and Pia Wurtzbach of the Philippines as the winner. This was originally the second time having a back-to-back victory after Venezuela in 2008-2009, since Paulina Vega is also from Colombia.

Gutiérrez later called the experience "humiliating" and declared that the television producers handled the mistake poorly. At a Colombian radio station, she remarked that it was a "great injustice and very humiliating for me."

After pageantry, Gutiérrez appeared the 2017 film XXX: Return of Xander Cage with American actor Vin Diesel. Gutiérrez later took part in the first American season of the reality show competition Celebrity Big Brother. She was evicted on finale night, placing tied 3rd/4th with Mark McGrath.

Personal life
Gutiérrez resides in Miami, Florida. She is the cousin of Miss Colombia 2013 and Miss Universe 2014 winner Paulina Vega.

Filmography

Television

Film

Music videos

In popular culture
Ariadna Gutiérrez was impersonated by James Leyva, stage name "Valentina," on season 9, episode 6 of RuPaul's Drag Race.

Notes

References

External links
 Official Miss Colombia website
 
 

1993 births
21st-century Colombian actresses
Colombian beauty pageant winners
Colombian expatriates in the United States
Colombian female models
Colombian film actresses
Living people
Miss Colombia winners
Miss Universe 2015 contestants
Participants in American reality television series
People from Barranquilla
People from Sincelejo